The 2016 BNP Paribas Open (also known as the 2016 Indian Wells Masters) was a professional tennis tournament played at Indian Wells, California in March 2016. It was the 43rd edition of the men's event and 28th of the women's event, and was classified as an ATP World Tour Masters 1000 event on the 2016 ATP World Tour and a Premier Mandatory event on the 2016 WTA Tour. Both the men's and the women's events took place at the Indian Wells Tennis Garden in Indian Wells, California, from March 7 through March 20, 2016, on outdoor hard courts.

Points and prize money

Point distribution

 Players with byes receive first-round points.

Prize money

ATP singles main-draw entrants

Seeds

The following are the seeded players. Rankings and seedings are based on ATP rankings as of March 7, 2016.

† The player did not qualify for the tournament in 2015. Accordingly, points for his 18th best result are deducted instead.

Other entrants
The following players received wildcards into the singles main draw:
  Juan Martín del Potro
  Jared Donaldson
  Taylor Fritz
  Mackenzie McDonald
  Frances Tiafoe

The following player received entry using a protected ranking into the main draw:
  Dmitry Tursunov

The following players received entry from the qualifying draw:
  Michael Berrer
  Bjorn Fratangelo
  Ryan Harrison
  Pierre-Hugues Herbert
  Jozef Kovalík
  Vincent Millot
  Renzo Olivo
  Peter Polansky
  Noah Rubin
  Alexander Sarkissian
  Tim Smyczek
  Marco Trungelliti

Withdrawals
Before the tournament
  Kevin Anderson → replaced by  Rajeev Ram
  Pablo Andújar → replaced by  Mikhail Kukushkin
  Marcos Baghdatis → replaced by   Evgeny Donskoy
  Simone Bolelli → replaced by  Dmitry Tursunov
  Roger Federer → replaced by  Alexander Zverev
  David Ferrer → replaced by   John Millman
  Fabio Fognini → replaced by  Mikhail Youzhny
  Andreas Haider-Maurer → replaced by  Ernests Gulbis
  Jerzy Janowicz → replaced by  Diego Schwartzman
  Ivo Karlović → replaced by  Lucas Pouille
  Paolo Lorenzi → replaced by  Damir Džumhur
  Tommy Robredo → replaced by  Kyle Edmund
  Sergiy Stakhovsky → replaced by  Thiemo de Bakker
  Janko Tipsarević → replaced by  Marcel Granollers

During the tournament
  Mikhail Youzhny

Retirements
  Martin Kližan
  Bernard Tomic

ATP doubles main-draw entrants

Seeds

1 Rankings as of March 7, 2016.

Other entrants
The following pairs received wildcards into the doubles main draw:
  Mahesh Bhupathi /  Stan Wawrinka
  Nick Kyrgios /  Alexander Zverev

The following pairs received entry as alternates:
  Jérémy Chardy /  Fabrice Martin
  Marek Michalička /  Ivo Minář

Withdrawals
Before the tournament
  Mahesh Bhupathi (leg injury)
  Nick Kyrgios (illness)

Retirements
  Robert Farah (neck injury)

WTA singles main-draw entrants

Seeds
The following are the seeded players. Seedings are based on WTA rankings as of February 29, 2016. Rankings and points before are as of March 7, 2016.

† The player did not qualify for the tournament in 2015. Accordingly, points for her 16th best result are deducted instead.

Other entrants
The following players received wildcards into the singles main draw:
  Samantha Crawford
  Lauren Davis
  Daniela Hantuchová
  Jamie Loeb
  Alison Riske
  Shelby Rogers
  Heather Watson
  Zhang Shuai

The following players received entry using a protected ranking into the main draw:
  Petra Cetkovská
  Vania King
  Peng Shuai
  Laura Robson
  Galina Voskoboeva

The following players received entry from the qualifying draw:
  Kiki Bertens
  Kateryna Bondarenko
  Nicole Gibbs
  Kurumi Nara
  Risa Ozaki
  Pauline Parmentier
  Kristýna Plíšková
  Aliaksandra Sasnovich
  Laura Siegemund
  Kateřina Siniaková
  Taylor Townsend
  Donna Vekić

The following player received entry as a lucky loser:
  Anna-Lena Friedsam

Withdrawals
Before the tournament
  Mona Barthel → replaced by  Magdaléna Rybáriková
  Alizé Cornet → replaced by  Mariana Duque Mariño
  Karin Knapp → replaced by  Vania King
  Varvara Lepchenko → replaced by  Tsvetana Pironkova
  Maria Sharapova (forearm injury and provisional suspension) →  replaced by Yulia Putintseva
  Carla Suárez Navarro → replaced by  Anna-Lena Friedsam
  Ajla Tomljanović → replaced by  Irina Falconi

Retirements
  Pauline Parmentier
  Barbora Strýcová
  Roberta Vinci

WTA doubles main-draw entrants

Seeds

1 Rankings as of February 29, 2016.

Other entrants
The following pairs received wildcards into the doubles main draw:
  Denisa Allertová /  Petra Kvitová
  Kirsten Flipkens /  Ana Ivanovic
  Angelique Kerber /  Andrea Petkovic
  Svetlana Kuznetsova /  Anastasia Pavlyuchenkova

The following pair received entry as alternates:
  Kateryna Bondarenko /  Olga Savchuk

Withdrawals
Before the tournament
  Caroline Garcia (back injury)

Champions

Men's singles

  Novak Djokovic def.  Milos Raonic, 6–2, 6–0

Women's singles

  Victoria Azarenka def.  Serena Williams, 6–4, 6–4

Men's doubles

  Pierre-Hugues Herbert /  Nicolas Mahut def.  Vasek Pospisil /  Jack Sock, 6–3, 7–6(7–5)

Women's doubles

  Bethanie Mattek-Sands /  CoCo Vandeweghe def.  Julia Görges /  Karolína Plíšková, 4–6, 6–4, [10–6]

References

External links

Association of Tennis Professionals (ATP) tournament profile

 
2016 BNP Paribas Open
2016 ATP World Tour
2016 WTA Tour
2016 in American tennis